Charles Willoughby may refer to:

 Charles Willoughby (politician) (1894–1995), member of Canadian Parliament
 Charles A. Willoughby (1892–1972), American military leader
 Charles Willoughby, 2nd Baron Willoughby of Parham (1536/7–1603), English peer
 Charles Willoughby, 10th Baron Willoughby of Parham (1650–1679), English peer
 Charles Willoughby, 14th Baron Willoughby of Parham (1681–1715), English peer

See also 
 Charl Willoughby (born 1974), South African cricketer